is a passenger railway station located in the city of Hannō, Saitama, Japan, operated by the private railway operator Seibu Railway.

Lines
Hannō is a terminating station, with trains continuing to Seibu-Chichibu reversing here.

Station layout

The station consists of one ground-level side platform and two island platforms, serving a total of four terminating tracks.

Platforms

History

The station opened on 15 April 1915.

Station numbering was introduced on all Seibu Railway lines during fiscal 2012, with Hannō Station becoming "SI26".

Passenger statistics
In fiscal 2019, the station was the 30th busiest on the Seibu network with an average of 32,929 passengers daily. The passenger figures for previous years are as shown below.

Surrounding area

North exit
 Higashi-Hannō Station
 
 Seibou Gakuen High School & Junior High School
 Saitama Prefectural Hannō High School

South exit
 Surugadai University
 Iruma River

See also
 List of railway stations in Japan

References

External links

 Hannō Station information (Seibu Railway) 
 Hannō Station information (Saitama Prefectural Government) 

Railway stations in Saitama Prefecture
Railway stations in Japan opened in 1915
Seibu Ikebukuro Line
Hannō